Shishan Town is a town in Nanhai District, Foshan, Guangdong, China.

Transport
Shishan railway station

External links

Nanhai District
Towns in Guangdong